Weeki Wachee Gardens is a census-designated place (CDP) in Hernando County, Florida, United States. The population was 1,146 at the 2010 census.

Geography
Weeki Wachee Gardens is located in western Hernando County at  (28.533569, -82.624784), along the Weeki Wachee River east of its mouth in the Gulf of Mexico. Shoal Line Boulevard is the main road through the community, leading northeast  to Cortez Boulevard and south  to Hernando Beach.

Demographics

As of the census of 2000, there were 1,140 people, 556 households, and 361 families residing in the CDP. The racial makeup of the CDP was 97.98% White, 0.18% African American, 0.79% Native American, 0.09% Asian, and 0.96% from two or more races. Hispanic or Latino of any race were 1.14% of the population.

There were 556 households, out of which 13.3% had children under the age of 18 living with them, 56.7% were married couples living together, 5.0% had a female householder with no husband present, and 34.9% were non-families. 27.5% of all households were made up of individuals, and 10.4% had someone living alone who was 65 years of age or older.  The average household size was 2.05 and the average family size was 2.39.

In the CDP, the population was spread out, with 12.2% under the age of 18, 3.7% from 18 to 24, 18.0% from 25 to 44, 39.5% from 45 to 64, and 26.7% who were 65 years of age or older.  The median age was 54 years. For every 100 females, there were 108.4 males.  For every 100 females age 18 and over, there were 106.0 males.

The median income for a household in the CDP was $29,826, and the median income for a family was $33,942. Males had a median income of $36,389 versus $19,583 for females. The per capita income for the CDP was $21,423.  About 10.1% of families and 9.0% of the population were below the poverty line, including 25.9% of those under age 18 and 3.9% of those age 65 or over.

References

Census-designated places in Hernando County, Florida
Census-designated places in Florida
Populated coastal places in Florida on the Gulf of Mexico